BAMS may refer to:

 Bachelor of Ayurveda, Medicine and Surgery, a professional medical degree in medicine focused on Ayurveda
 Binary angular measurement system - a digital representation of angles used by computers
 British Art Medal Society
 Broad Area Maritime Surveillance
 Broadcast to Allied Merchant Ships, an encryption system used by the British Admiralty during World War II
 Bulletin of the American Mathematical Society
 Bulletin of the American Meteorological Society
 BAM Shallow (see: Tropical cyclone forecast model)